Chavan-e Alamdar (also Romanized as Chavān-e ‘Alamdār; also known as ‘Alamdār) is a village in Sarajuy-ye Shomali Rural District, in the Central District of Maragheh County, East Azerbaijan Province, Iran. At the 2006 census, its population was 16, in 5 families.

References 

Towns and villages in Maragheh County